Kazuo Ietani (born 25 August 1977) is a Japanese long-distance runner who specializes in the half marathon.

He finished eighth at the 2005 World Half Marathon Championships, which was good enough to help Japan finish third in the team competition.

His personal best time is 1:02:18 hours, achieved in March 2007 in Yamaguchi. In the 10,000 metres his personal best time is 28:34.04 minutes, achieved in April 2007 in Kobe.

Achievements

References

1977 births
Living people
Japanese male long-distance runners